Lamin is a surname. Notable people include:
Adam Ben Lamin (b. 2001), Swedish-borrn Tunisian footballer
Luchaa Mohamed Lamin (1952–2013), Sahrawi politician
Mike Lamin, Sierra Leonean politician
Nadhira Luchaa Mohamed-Lamin (b. 1989), Sahrawi actress

See also
Lamin (given name)